Sean Cisterna is a Canadian film director and producer from Orillia, Ontario, most noted for his 2019 film From the Vine.

Cisterna directed a number of direct-to-video comedy and horror films before making the YTV television film King of the Camp, in 2008. He followed up with the feature film Moon Point in 2011, the documentary 30 Ghosts in 2013, and the feature films Full Out (2015) and Kiss and Cry (2017).

In 2022 he premiered the documentary film The Long Rider.

His film Boy City entered production in 2021, and is slated to premiere at the 2022 Whistler Film Festival.

References

External links

21st-century Canadian screenwriters
21st-century Canadian male writers
Film producers from Ontario
Canadian male screenwriters
Film directors from Ontario
Canadian documentary film directors
People from Orillia
Living people
Year of birth missing (living people)